Jonas Henry Arnell-Szurkos, previously Arnell, born February 28, 1969, in Örebro, Sweden, is a Swedish phaleristician. Since January 1, 2023, he is Herald at the Chancery of the Swedish Royal Orders of Knighthood, after being Amanuensis 2018–2022.

Biography 
Arnell-Szurkos was raised in Eskilstuna and has a degree of Bachelor of Education from Linköping University and a degree of Bachelor of Social Science from Stockholm University. Between 1995 and 2014 he worked in the education, research and culture field, most prominently as political advisor in the Parliament Chancery of the Christian Democrats. Presently, Arnell-Szurkos is the deputy secretary-general for the Swedish Soldiers Homes Association, He was elected Member of the Royal Swedish Society Pro Patria in 2019.

Phaleristics 
Arnell-Szurkos has been committed to phaleristics since 1990, since 1998 as a phaleristics writer and lecturer in Sweden and abroad. One aspect has been to support and promote genuine orders of chivalry, a work for which Arnell-Szurkos has received several awards.

In 1999 Arnell-Szurkos launched a lobby campaign via e-mails to the MPs of the Parliament of Sweden to undo the Orders Reform of 1975 (which reserved the Order of the Seraphim and the Order of the Polar Star for foreign and stateless citizens and put the Order of the Sword and the Order of Vasa  dormant). This contributed to his subsequent employment at the Parliament Chancery of the Christian Democrats. Arnell-Szurkos was active in this question for almost 20 years. Different Christian Democratic MP's made motions on his drafts 1999-2001, 2004-2007, 2009-2011 and 2014. No motion carried, as a majority of Parliament votes could not be reached. The reoccurring motions was instead a way to keep life in the matter, until the Awards Reform.

In 2017, Arnell-Szurkos was one of three taking initiative to found the Swedish Phaleristics Association and in 2020 he was elected member of the International Commission for Orders of Chivalry.  Since January 1, 2023, Arnell-Szurkos is Herald in the Chancery of the Swedish Royal Orders of Knighthood, after being  Amanuensis 2018-2022.

Heraldry 
Arnell-Szurkos is also committed to heraldry and has been the Herald Pursuivant for the Swedish Heraldry Association 2002–2008 and member of the Vapenbilden editorial board 2008–2013. He was elected member of the Heraldic Society in 2004.

Selected awards and decorations 
  The Royal Patriotic Society's large medal in gold (2015) for significant acts, 25 years as a phaleristician
  Cross of Merit with Silver Star of the Order of the Holy Sepulchre motu proprio (2017, Cross of Merit 2011)
 Fellow of The Society of Sciences in Lund (2021)
 Honorary Member of the Student Union of the Faculty of Philosophy, Linköping University (2021)
 Associate Companion of the Military Order of the Loyal Legion of the United States (2013)

External links
 Orders, decorations and medals in Sverige - Official website
 jonar242 on Orders, Decorations and Medals in Sweden - Official blog

Printed Articles 
 Arnell, J. (2012) Davor Zovko – Heraldic Artist. In: Contemporary International Ex Libris Artists. Vol 16. 
 Arnell, J. (2006) Order of the Seraphim. In: World Orders of Knighthood and Merit. Vol I. 373-379. London: Burke's Peerage & Baronetage.
 Arnell, J. (2006) Order of the Sword. In: World Orders of Knighthood and Merit. Vol I. 505-510. London: Burke's Peerage & Baronetage.
 Arnell, J. (2006) Order of the Polar Star. In: World Orders of Knighthood and Merit. Vol I. 510-515. London: Burke's Peerage & Baronetage.
 Arnell, J. (2006) Order of the Vasa. In: World Orders of Knighthood and Merit. Vol I. 515-520. London: Burke's Peerage & Baronetage.
 Arnell, J. (2006) Order of Charles XIII. In: World Orders of Knighthood and Merit. Vol II. 1744-1747. London: Burke's Peerage & Baronetage.

References 

Living people
1969 births
People from Örebro
Linköping University alumni
Stockholm University alumni
Swedish heraldry